Lea Moreno Young (born November 10, 1977) is an American actress.

Career

In 2000, Lea Moreno starred in the short-lived TV series Brutally Normal.

Filmography

Television

References

External links
 

1977 births
20th-century American actresses
21st-century American actresses
Actresses from California
American film actresses
American television actresses
People from Mission Viejo, California
Living people